The 1983–84 SMU Mustangs men's basketball team represented Southern Methodist University as a member of the Southwest Conference during the 1983–84 men's college basketball season. The team was led by fourth-year head coach Dave Bliss and played their home games at Moody Coliseum.

Roster

Schedule and results

|-
!colspan=9 style=| Regular season

|-
!colspan=9 style=| Southwest Conference tournament

|-
!colspan=9 style=| 1985 NCAA tournament

References 

SMU Mustangs men's basketball seasons
SMU
SMU
SMU
SMU